C. robustum  may refer to:
 Calophyllum robustum, a flowering plant species found only in Papua New Guinea
 Commidendrum robustum, the Saint Helena gumwood, a tree species of the island of Saint Helena in the South Atlantic Ocean

See also
 Quebcec